Ahmed Mohammed Baba Jamal (born 7 May 1969) is a Ghanaian politician. He was a member of Parliament for Akwatia Constituency. He served as the deputy minister-designate for Local Government and Rural Development.

Early life and education 
Baba Jamal was born in 1969 at Akwatia in the Eastern region of Ghana. He holds an MPhil in International Politics and a degree in law from the University of Ghana.

Career 
He worked as the managing director of Meeme Business venture in Akwatia. And also served as the deputy general secretary of the National Democratic Congress. After nine years, Baba Jamal was able to make it to the bar and he happen to be part of the 219 lawyers called to  the bar in 2015.

Politics 
On 7 December 2012, Baba Jamal won the parliamentary seat for Akwatia constituency for the first time, on the ticket of the National Democratic Congress in the 2012 Ghanaian General Elections obtaining 50.44% of the total valid votes cast.

He however lost the seat to Mercy Ama Sey in the 2016 General Elections after he polled 15,905 votes while Mercy Ama Sey garnered 21,433 of the total valid votes cast.

Personal life. 
He is a Muslim and a married man with five children.

References 

Living people
1969 births
University of Ghana alumni
National Democratic Congress (Ghana) politicians
Ghanaian MPs 2013–2017